Anders Syberg (born 10 May 1988) is a Danish former professional footballer, who played as a midfielder.

Syberg made his senior debut with AGF, making one league appearance for the club. In May 2008, Syberg moved to FC Vestsjælland. Syberg moved to Hobro IK in December 2009.

References

1988 births
Living people
Danish men's footballers
Aarhus Gymnastikforening players
Danish Superliga players
Danish 1st Division players
Danish 2nd Division players
Brabrand IF players
Hobro IK players
Odder IGF players

Association football midfielders
FC Vestsjælland players
VSK Aarhus players
Footballers from Aarhus
AB Tårnby players
Herlev IF players